Pseudocyphellaria brattii is a species of foliose lichen in the family Peltigeraceae. It was described as new to science in 1997 by lichenologists David John Galloway and Gintaras Kantvilas. The specific epithet honours Tasmanian lichenologist Geoffrey Charles Bratt, who, according to the authors, "helped to keep Australian lichenology alive during the 'lean years'".

The lichen is endemic to Tasmania, where it is uncommon. It typically grows in deep shade on logs, or on plants.

References

brattii
Lichen species
Lichens described in 1997
Lichens of Australia
Taxa named by David Galloway (botanist)
Taxa named by Gintaras Kantvilas